Sukhur may refer to:

Sukhur-e Ali Mohammad-e Gol Mohammadi
Sukhur-e Allahi
Sukhur-e Hajji Morad
Sukhur-e Karmi
Sukhur-e Khush Aqbal
Sukhur-e Kohzad
Sukhur-e Morovvati
Sukhur-e Namdar-e Abdi
Sukhur-e Namdar-e Mirzapur
Sukhur-e Rashid-e Olya
Sukhur-e Rashid-e Sofla
Sukhur-e Shahbaz-e Najafi
Sukhur-e Shahbaz-e Shiri

See also
 Sukkur